Kabinda is a territory of Lomami province in the Democratic Republic of the Congo. See Kabinda.

Territories of Lomami Province